Clivina pandana is a species of ground beetle in the subfamily Scaritinae. It was described by Andrewes in 1938.

References

pandana
Beetles described in 1938